Giovanni de La Bronda (1560–1633) was a Roman Catholic prelate who served as Bishop of Ampurias e Civita (1622–1633).

Biography
Giovanni de La Bronda was born in 1562.
On 19 September 1622, he was appointed during the papacy of Pope Gregory XV as Bishop of Ampurias e Civita.
On 13 December 1622, he was consecrated bishop by Marco Antonio Gozzadini, Cardinal-Priest of Sant'Eusebio, with Alessandro Bosco, Bishop of Gerace, and Girolamo Tantucci, Bishop of Grosseto, serving as co-consecrators. 
He served as Bishop of Ampurias e Civita until his death in 1633.

References 

17th-century Roman Catholic bishops in Spain
Bishops appointed by Pope Gregory XV
1560 births
1633 deaths